Mahdia is a town and commune in Tiaret Province in northwestern Algeria.

Founded in 1905 by Auguste Burdeau, the town bore the name Burdeau during the French colonial era.

References

Communes of Tiaret Province
Algeria
Cities in Algeria